Chollangipeta is a village in Denkada Mandal of Vizianagaram district, Andhra Pradesh, India.

Demographics
 Indian census, the demographic details of this village is as follows:
 Total Population: 	1,310 in 310 Households
 Male Population: 	667
 Female Population: 	643
 Children Under 6-years of age: 176 (Boys - 89 and Girls - 87)
 Total Literates: 	572

References

Villages in Vizianagaram district